This article covers the 2007 season of the Richmond Football Club AFL team.

Captains 
 Captain: Kane Johnson
 Vice-Captain: Nathan Brown
 Deputy Vice-Captain: Joel Bowden

Club List

Player List

Rookie List

Changes from 2006 List

Additions 

 Graham Polak - Traded from Fremantle
 Jack Riewoldt - Pick 13 in 2006 AFL Draft
 Shane Edwards - Pick 26
 Daniel Connors - Pick 58
 Carl Peterson - Pick 60
 Andrew Collins - Pick 73
 Kent Kingsley - Pre Season Draft Pick 6
 Drew Moden - Pre Season Draft Pick 1 (brownlow contender)

Deletions 

 Mark Chaffey - Retired
 Greg Stafford
 Andrew Kellaway - Delisted
 Thomas Roach
 David Rodan
 Dean Limbach

Games

Wizard Cup

Home and Away

See also 
 2007 AFL Season
 Richmond Football Club

External links 
Official Websites
 Official Website of the Richmond Football Club
 Official Website of the Australian Football League 

Richmond Football Club Season, 2007
2007
Richmond Football Club Season, 2007